Benjamin Nicholas Monroe (born April 12, 1982) is an American former professional tennis player. 
Monroe was a doubles specialist and won four ATP World Tour doubles titles and thirteen ATP Challenger Tour titles in his career.

He is currently coaching American player Jack Sock.

College career 
Monroe had a highly successful college career at the University of North Carolina at Chapel Hill from 2000 to 2004. His achievements include:

 University of North Carolina's Senior Male Student-Athlete of the Year (2003–2004)
 All-American Status (2003–2004)
 All-ACC Status (2002–2004)
 2nd in all-time singles wins (100) at the University of North Carolina at Chapel Hill
 Recipient of the Arthur Ashe Regional Sportsmanship Award (2003–2004)
 National and Regional NCAA/ITF John Van Nostrand Sportsmanship Awards (2003–2004)

Professional career

2001
Nicholas competed in doubles in his first main-draw Futures match. He and partner (compatriot) Tripp Phillips lost in the first round of USA F21. This was the only tour event he competed in 2001.

2002
Monroe reached the quarterfinals of his first Futures tournament in singles play, USA F11, played in Peoria, Illinois in July.

2003
Nicholas won his first Futures doubles match, partnering Yannis Vlachos to the semifinals of Slovenia F1.

2004: Turned Pro
After playing only four Futures events in 2003, Monroe played, from June, a full schedule in 2004. In his first doubles tournament of the year, he reached his first final, partnering Jonathan Igbinovia. In August he reached his first singles semifinal, at Indonesia F2 in Makassar. In October, Monroe captured his first doubles Futures title, in doubles, partnering Márcio Torres, at Venezuela F3. He won a second two weeks later, Mexico F17, playing alongside Jeremy Wurtzman. Later in November, Monroe played in his first Challenger tournament, the Puebla Challenger in Puebla, Mexico, losing in the first round to Santiago González. In doubles, he and Wurtzman reached the semifinals. Three weeks later in Guadalajara, however, he won two Challenger matches to reach the quarterfinals.

2005
His first full year as a professional, Nicholas played ITF Circuit and USTA Pro Circuit events. He reached his first final and won his first singles title at the ITF Circuit event in South Africa, when he defeated Stephen Mitchell. Highly successful in doubles, Nick won four titles in 2005: with Jeremy Wurtzman at the USTA Pro Circuit event in Orange Park, Florida; with Izak van der Merwe at ITF Circuit events in Botswana and Zimbabwe; and with Sam Warburg at the ITF Circuit event in Israel.

Monroe competed in 29 events in 2005, all but one of which were Futures. He lost in the first round of his only main draw Challenger event singles match, to Zack Fleishman at the Cuenca Challenger. Monroe won his first singles title, South Africa F1 in late October, defeating Stephen Mitchell in the final.

2006
Nicholas started the year by winning the ITF Circuit title in Costa Rica. A month later, he won another ITF title, this time in Nigeria. He reached the semifinals of a USTA Pro Circuit event in Little Rock, before reaching back-to-back finals in India. He lost to Karan Rastogi in Delhi and defeated Sunil-Kumar Sipaeya in Dehradun. He reached another ITF Circuit final in the fall in Japan, where he lost to Satoshi Iwabuchi. At the beginning of the year, Nick won consecutive doubles titles on the ITF Circuit with partner Sam Warburg in Mexico and Costa Rica.

2007
Nicholas began the year by attempting to qualify for the 2007 Australian Open. He defeated Jeremy Chardy in his first round singles qualifying match. He reached consecutive ITF Futures events in Japan, where he lost to Gouichi Motomura both times. He won two titles at ITF Futures events in Mexico and won a USTA Pro Circuit event in Rochester, New York, where he defeated Robert Yim in the final. The fall of 2007 saw Monroe reach the semifinals of USTAPro Circuit events in Manchester, Texas, where he lost to eventual champion Michael McClune, and Waikoloa, Hawaii where he lost to Lester Cook. He partnered with Izak van der Merwe to win the USTA Pro Circuit doubles title in Brownsville, Texas.

2012: Challenger circuit doubles success
Nicholas won the Challenger in Medellin, Colombia (doubles) with his partner Maciek Sykut.

He also won two doubles Challengers in Mexico with German partner, Simon Stadler.

2013–2015: First Three ATP doubles titles

Nicholas had his best year as a professional in 2013, finishing the year with a doubles Ranking of World No. 53.
In January 2013, Monroe and partner Raven Klaasen made it to the semifinals of the 2013 Aircel Chennai Open, falling to Benoît Paire and Stanislas Wawrinka, after a surprise quarterfinal win over the #1 Seeds Mahesh Bhupathi and Daniel Nestor.
He then teamed up successfully with Simon Stadler to play the Copa Claro in Buenos Aires, Argentina. They made it to the final, falling to the Italian pair of Fabio Fognini and Simone Bolelli. In July 2013, he won his first ATP title in doubles also with Stadler at the 250 level at the 2013 Bastad Skistar Swedish Open and reached the final of the 2013 Umag Open in Croatia also on clay.

2017–18: Continued doubles success: First Masters final & US Open quarterfinal, top 30 debut
Following three semi-final finishes in Chennai, Auckland and Quito all with Artem Sitak, Monroe reached a top 40 doubles ranking of No. 39 on 3 April 2017 after the biggest run of his career to the final of the 2017 Miami Open with Jack Sock. He later peaked at a career-high of No. 30 on 2 October 2017 after reaching his ninth final at the 2017 ATP Shenzhen Open partnering Nikola Mektic.

Partnering Artem Sitak he reached the third round at the 2017 Wimbledon Championships for their first time at this Major and in his career. With John-Patrick Smith at the 2017 US Open (tennis), he reached the quarterfinals at a Grand Slam also for the first time in his career.

The pair also won the title at the 2018 Atlanta Open, and reached earlier in February 2018 the final at the 2018 Delray Beach Open, Monroe’s tenth.

2019–2020: Thirteenth final, Second Major quarterfinal at the French Open
Monroe reached the final of the 2019 Winston-Salem Open partnering compatriot Tennys Sandgren.

Partnering fellow American Tommy Paul, he also reached at the 2020 French Open the second doubles Grand Slam quarterfinal of his career.

2021–2022: Australian Open third round
He reached the third round at the 2021 Australian Open for the first time at this Major partnering Frances Tiafoe.

He entered the main draw at the 2022 Wimbledon Championships as an alternate pair again with Tommy Paul.

World TeamTennis

Nicholas has played three seasons with World TeamTennis starting in 2006 when he debuted in the league with the Springfield Lasers, followed by a season with the Kansas City Explorers in 2012 and the Washington Kastles in 2019. It was announced that he will re-joining the Washington Kastles during the 2020 WTT season set to begin July 12 at The Greenbrier.

Significant finals

ATP Masters 1000 finals

Doubles: 1 (1 runner-up)

ATP career finals

Doubles: 13 (4 titles, 9 runner-ups)

ATP Challenger Tour finals

Doubles: 33 (13–20)

Doubles performance timeline

Current after the 2022 US Open.

References

External links 
 
 

1982 births
Living people
African-American male tennis players
American male tennis players
North Carolina Tar Heels men's tennis players
Sportspeople from Oklahoma City
Tennis people from North Carolina
Tennis people from Oklahoma
Tennis players at the 2011 Pan American Games
Sportspeople from Manhattan Beach, California
Pan American Games silver medalists for the United States
Pan American Games bronze medalists for the United States
Pan American Games medalists in tennis
Medalists at the 2011 Pan American Games
21st-century African-American sportspeople
20th-century African-American people